Petro Verhun (In Ukrainian: Петро Вергун) was a Ukrainian Greek Catholic priest and martyr.

Verhun was born on November 18, 1890 in Harodok, Lviv Region. He held a Ph.D. in philosophy, and on October 30, 1927 he was ordained at St. George's cathedral in Lviv by Metropolitan Andrei Sheptyski. Later he would be moved to the Visator for Ukrainian Greek Catholics in all of Germany. Those who knew him in this position felt that he was a faithful leader who would be willing to sacrifice himself for his flock.

In June 1945, the Soviet security forces came to Verhum in Berlin and arrested him and then sent him to Siberia for 8 years of hard labor. Even here, though, while undergoing unbearable living conditions, he was able to gather the faithful.

On February 7, 1957 he died a martyr for the faith in the exile village of Angarskoie, in the Krasnoyarsk territory.

Testimony From Siberia 
“My life is very monotonous. I have enough to eat. I cook for myself. My greatest joy is that I can pray every day without disturbances Finally I don’t need anything. I feel that my head is tending little by little to my eternal rest. But I really would rather die in the monastery.” – From the letters of Father Petro Verhun written in Siberian exile.

Further reading 

 Christian Weise: Verhun, Petro. In: Biographisch-Bibliographisches Kirchenlexikon (BBKL). Band 29, Bautz, Nordhausen 2008, Sp. 1491–1498.
 Helmut Moll (Hrsg. im Auftrag der Deutschen Bischofskonferenz), Zeugen für Christus. Das deutsche Martyrologium des 20. Jahrhunderts, Paderborn u. a. 1999, 7. überarbeitete und aktualisierte Auflage 2019, Band II, S. 1100–1104.
 о. Тарас Пошивак. Священномученик Петро Вергун: Архівні документи. Свідчення. Спогади. — Дрогобич: Коло, 2018. — 282 S. .
 Fünfundzwanzig Selige der griechisch-katholischen Kirche der Ukrainer
 https://www.heiligenlexikon.de/BiographienP/Petrus_Werhun.htm
 https://catholicsaints.info/blessed-peter-verhun
 http://www.encyclopediaofukraine.com/display.asp?linkpath=pages%5CV%5CE%5CVerhunPetro.htm

References 

Members of the Ukrainian Greek Catholic Church
Eastern Catholic priests
20th-century Eastern Catholic martyrs
Catholic people executed by the Soviet Union
Clergy from Lviv
1890 births
1957 deaths